The 2016–17 season was Al-Batin's first season in Pro League (and their first ever season in the top-flight) after gaining promotion in the previous season. This season Al-Batin participated in the Pro League, King Cup and Crown Prince Cup. The season covered the period from 1 July 2016 to 30 June 2017.

Players

Squad information

Transfers

In

Loans in

Out

Loans out

Pre-season friendlies

Competitions

Overall

Last Updated: 4 May 2017

Pro League

League table

Results summary

Results by round

Matches
All times are local, AST (UTC+3).

Relegation play-offs
As a result of Al-Batin finishing in twelfth place, they faced Najran the 3rd-placed of the First Division for the play-offs.
All times are local, AST (UTC+3).

Crown Prince Cup

All times are local, AST (UTC+3).

King Cup

Statistics

Squad statistics
As of 16 May 2017.

|}

Goalscorers

Last Updated: 16 May 2017

Clean sheets

Last Updated: 16 May 2017

References

Al Batin FC seasons
Batin